Upper Wong Tai Sin Estate is a public housing estate in Wong Tai Sin, Kowloon, Hong Kong, along the north of Lung Cheung Road, near Wong Tai Sin Temple and MTR Wong Tai Sin station. It consists of eight blocks built in 2000 and 2009 respectively, and it is now undergoing redevelopment.

Background
Upper Wong Tai Sin Estate was a Government Low Cost Housing Estate, called Wong Tai Sin Government Low Cost Housing Estate. It was divided into eastern and western parts. Western part had a total of 14 blocks (no Block 13) built in 1963 while Eastern part had 5 totally blocks in 1965. In 1973, it was renamed as Upper Wong Tai Sin Estate. In 1980, Block 8 of Lower Wong Tai Sin Estate, located at the south of Lung Cheung Road, was reassigned to Upper Wong Tai Sin Estate. And it was renamed as "Cheung Yan House".

Between 1997 and 1998, Block 1 to 12 were demolished to reconstruct seven blocks (completed in 2000) and Lung Cheung Mall. In 2002, Block 14 and 15 were demolished to construct a block (completed in 2009). Between 2005 and 2007, a carnival-type bazaar, "Creative Arts Playground", was established on the vacant eastern site to provide employment opportunities and promote district characteristics. After the activity ended, Wong Tai Sin Square is now being constructed on the site.

Houses

Others
Lower Wong Tai Sin Estate

References

Residential buildings completed in 2000
Residential buildings completed in 2009
Wong Tai Sin
Public housing estates in Hong Kong
Proposed infrastructure in Hong Kong
Chuk Yuen